Grund or Gründ may refer to:

Places
 Bad Grund, a town in Lower Saxony, Germany
 Bad Grund (Samtgemeinde), a Samtgemeinde in Lower Saxony, Germany
 Grund (Grindelwald), a locality in the municipality of Grindelwald, Bern, Switzerland
 Grund (Hilchenbach), a community in Hilchenbach, North Rhine-Westphalia, Germany
 Grund (Luxembourg), a quarter of the city of Luxembourg, Luxembourg
 Grund (Saanen), a village in the municipality of Saanen, Bern, Switzerland
 Saas-Grund, a town in Valais, Switzerland

Other uses
 Grund (surname)
 Éditions Gründ, French publisher

See also
 Grundt, a surname
 Grunt (disambiguation)